Get a Job may refer to:

Music 
 "Get a Job" (song), a 1957 song by The Silhouettes
 "Get a Job", a song by Gossip from A Joyful Noise

Television episodes 
 "Get a Job" (Brandy & Mr. Whiskers)
 "Get a Job" (Even Stevens)
 "Get a Job" (The Fresh Prince of Bel-Air)
 "Get a Job" (Grounded for Life)

Film 
 Get a Job (1985 film), a winner of the Genie Award for Best Animated Short
 Get a Job (1998 film), a film starring Bobbie Brown
 Get a Job (2011 film), a film produced by Stefan Schaefer
 Get a Job (2016 film), a film starring Anna Kendrick and Miles Teller directed by Dylan Kidd

See also
 Job (disambiguation)
 The Job (disambiguation)
 Get a life (disambiguation)